Ramiz, Rameez or Rhomeez / is an Arabic masculine given name meaning "one who communicates well", "wise", "noble", or "intelligent"..

Notable people 
Ramiz Alia (born 1925), former President of Albania
Ramiz Tafilaj (born 1949), Albanian-American businessman
Ramiz Jaraisy (born 1951), Arab-Israeli politician
Rameez Raja (born 1962), Pakistani cricketer and commentator
Ramiz Delalić (1963–2007), Bosnian fighter
Ramiz Mammadov (born 1968), Azerbaijani footballer
Ramiz Mamedov (born 1972), Azerbaijani-Russian footballer
Ramez Galal (born 1973), Egyptian prankster, actor, and singer
Ramiz Kerimov (born 1981), Azerbaijani footballer
Ramez Dayoub (born 1984), Lebanese footballer

See also
Ramziddin Sayidov (born 1982), Uzbekistani judoka
KF Ramiz Sadiku, Kosovan football club
Ramez Wakel el-Gaw, Egyptian pranking television program

References

Arabic masculine given names